Taken 3 (sometimes stylized as TAK3N) is a 2014 English-language French action-thriller film directed by Olivier Megaton and written by Luc Besson and Robert Mark Kamen. It is the third and final installment in the Taken trilogy. A co-production between France, Spain and the United States, the film stars Liam Neeson, Forest Whitaker, Maggie Grace and Famke Janssen.

The film was released in Germany in late 2014, and then in the United States on 9 January 2015 by 20th Century Fox and in France on 21 January 2015 by EuropaCorp Distribution. It grossed $326 million worldwide and received generally unfavorable reviews from critics.

Plot
Retired CIA officer Bryan Mills, visits his daughter, Kim, to deliver an early birthday gift. After an awkward visit, he invites his former wife, Lenore, to dinner. Although she declines, she later shows up at his apartment and tells him about her marital problems, but says she wants to make it work. Later, her husband, Stuart, tells Bryan never to see his wife again. Stuart secretly uses Bryan's phone to arrange a meeting with Lenore, making it appear that Bryan sent it and then deletes the message afterwards. Lenore is kidnapped when she arrives for the bogus meeting.

The next morning, Bryan receives a text from Lenore asking to meet for breakfast. When Bryan returns home, he discovers Lenore's body. Two LAPD officers immediately appear to arrest him, but Bryan subdues two officers, leads other officers on a chase through the neighborhood, disappears into the sewer system, and escapes. Meanwhile, LAPD Detective Frank Dotzler reviews Bryan's background.

Bryan retreats to a safe house equipped with weapons and surveillance electronics. He retraces Lenore's final movements to a gas station and obtains the surveillance footage showing her being abducted by men with distinctive hand tattoos. LAPD detectives arrive to arrest him, but Bryan hijacks the police cruiser and downloads phone records from an LAPD database onto a thumb drive. He contacts Kim at Lenore's funeral via a camera hidden in his friend Sam's suit, and instructs her to maintain her "very predictable schedule." Bryan arranges to meet with her later and removes a surveillance bug, which Dotzler planted on her. Kim tells Bryan that she is pregnant, and that Stuart is acting scared and has hired bodyguards.

Bryan chases Stuart's car, but a pursuing SUV ambushes him, forcing his car over a cliff. Bryan survives, hijacks another car, and follows the attackers to a roadside liquor store. Bryan kills the men, then abducts and interrogates Stuart using waterboarding. Stuart confesses that his former business partner and ex-Russian Spetsnaz operator, Oleg Malankov, murdered Lenore because Stuart owes him money; Stuart exposed Bryan's identity to Malankov out of jealousy.

With assistance from his old colleagues and a nervous Stuart, Bryan gains entry to Malankov's heavily secured penthouse. After Bryan kills Malankov's guards and fights Malankov, a mortally-wounded Malankov reveals that Stuart planned Lenore's murder and framed Bryan as part of a business deal to collect a $12,000,000 life insurance policy. Malankov adds that when Stuart failed to kill Bryan, he used Bryan to try and kill Malankov so Stuart could keep the insurance money.

Meanwhile, Stuart abducts Kim, intending to flee with the money. Under police pursuit, Bryan arrives at the airport in Malankov's Porsche as Stuart's private plane is preparing for takeoff. After destroying the landing gear with the Porsche, Bryan overpowers Stuart. Heeding Kim's pleas, Bryan refrains from killing Stuart, but warns him to expect retribution if he escapes justice or receives a reduced prison sentence. Dotzler and the LAPD arrive and arrest Stuart while Bryan is cleared.

In the aftermath, Kim tells Bryan she wants to name her baby after her mother if it's a girl.

Cast

 Liam Neeson as Bryan Mills
 Forest Whitaker as Inspector Frank Dotzler
 Maggie Grace as Kim Mills
 Famke Janssen as Lenore Mills-St. John
 Dougray Scott as Stuart St. John
 Sam Spruell as Oleg Malankov
 Leland Orser as Sam Gilroy
 Jon Gries as Mark Casey
 David Warshofsky as Bernie Harris
 Jonny Weston as Jimmy
 Don Harvey as Detective Garcia
 Dylan Bruno as Detective Smith
 Al Sapienza as Detective Johnson

Production
On 28 September 2012, Liam Neeson said that there would not be a third film, or that the chances of Taken 3 happening were minimal. Later, in October 2012, the screenwriters for the first two films told Hollywood that 20th Century Fox and EuropaCorp wanted them to do a third film, but it would go in another direction. As of 24 June 2013, the script was being written by the film writers, but no director was set. On 12 March 2014, Maggie Grace joined the cast, followed by closing a deal with Famke Janssen the next day. On 24 March 2014, Leland Orser also returned to play his character, as did Jon Gries. On 31 March 2014, Jonny Weston signed on to appear in the film as Kim's boyfriend. Neeson asked for and was paid $20 million for the role, as the film only cost $48 million to make, his pay alone was nearly half the budget.

Filming
Principal photography of the film began on 29 March 2014 in Los Angeles, as well as in Atlanta. On 24 April 2014, filming began in Covington, Georgia, where they filmed scenes at Newton College & Career Academy over the course of two days.

Music
Nathaniel Méchaly was set to score the film.

All songs written and composed by Nathaniel Méchaly except where noted.

Release
A trailer of Taken 3 the film saw its release on January 1, 2015, in Hong Kong and South Korea; on January 8, the film was released in the UK, in Spain on January 16, in France on January 21 and on February 12 in Italy.

20th Century Fox released the film on 9 January 2015 in the United States. The film was released under the title of "Taken 3 – L'ora della verità" in Italy, "Búsqueda implacable 3" in Mexico, "V3nganza" in Spain, "96 Hours -- Taken 3" in Germany and "Заложница 3" in Russia.

Taken 3 employed a "somewhat unconventional" marketing strategy with business-focused social network LinkedIn selecting one fan to have their "particular set of LinkedIn skills" endorsed by Liam Neeson's character Mills (a nod to a line in the first Taken, where Mills outlined his "very particular set of skills").

Box office
The film grossed $89.3 million in North America and $236.5 million in other territories for a worldwide gross of $326.4 million, against a budget of $55 million.

In North America, the film earned $14.7 million on its opening day (including previews), which is the fourth-highest opening day for a film released in January behind 2015's American Sniper ($30.5 million), 2008's Cloverfield ($17.16 million) and 2012's The Devil Inside ($16.8 million). It topped the box office in its opening weekend with $39.2 million against a $38 – $39 million projection, making it the second highest debut in the Taken franchise behind Taken 2 ($49 million) and the fourth-highest January opening of all time behind American Sniper ($89.2 million), Ride Along ($41.5 million) and Cloverfield ($40.1 million).

Outside North America, the film opened a week prior to its US debut in South Korea and Hong Kong, and earned $8 million and $1.27 million, respectively, for a total of $9.34 million. In its actual opening weekend outside of North America, the film was #2 behind Night at the Museum: Secret of the Tomb, earning $41 million from 4,730 screens in 36 markets. Highest international openings were witnessed in the UK and Malta ($10.86 million) and Australia ($4.8 million). It also went #1 in Taiwan, Malaysia, Singapore and Thailand. The film opened to first place in the UK with $5.5 million, and debuted in Germany with $4.4 million, Russia with $2.2 million, Philippines with $2.5 million, which is the second-biggest opening ever for 20th Century Fox, and Spain with $1.2 million.

Critical response
The film was poorly received by critics, with most of the criticisms directed at the film's action sequences, plot, direction, and film editing, though the acting was praised. On Rotten Tomatoes the film holds a rating of 12%, based on 115 reviews, with an average rating of 3.6/10, becoming the worst-rated film of the trilogy. The site's critical consensus reads, "Hampered by toothless PG-13 action sequences, incoherent direction, and a hackneyed plot, Taken 3 serves as a clear signal that it's well past time to retire this franchise." On Metacritic the film has a score of 26 out of 100, based on 30 critics, indicating "generally unfavorable reviews."

Nicolas Rapold of The New York Times gave the film a negative rating, writing, "The logy screenplay, by Luc Besson and Robert Mark Kamen, sags under head-clutchingly banal dramatic scenes. Only Liam Neeson's appeal somehow survives unscathed, perhaps the most impressive stunt of all." Maggie Lee of Variety also went negative for the film, saying, "The third and presumably final installment of the Liam Neeson action franchise is a mind-numbing, crash-bang misfire". Betsy Sharkey of the Los Angeles Times, giving the film a negative review, writes, "Taken 3 is so unintentionally hilarious I couldn't help but wonder -- do movie contracts carry a humiliation bonus clause these days?" Joe Neumaier of New York Daily News gave the film 0 stars out of 5, saying, "Here it's the audience that gets taken".

Mick LaSalle of the San Francisco Chronicle gave the film a negative review, saying, "If you love the other Taken movies, you will like this. But if you're determined to love it, you'll have to talk yourself into it -- and even then, it might not work." Ignatiy Vishnevetsky of The A.V. Club gave the film a C− grade, stating, "Because Mills' hyper-competence never seems exciting, it instead becomes giggle-inducing." Peter Travers of Rolling Stone gave the film zero stars, commenting, "Be warned, sequel fanboys: This thing sucks! At 62, Neeson still has a glare that means badass. Nothing else makes a damn lick of sense. The only thing getting taken is the audience."

Conversely, the film received a more positive review from Amy Nicholson of LA Weekly, who gave the film a grade of C, saying, "All you need to know about Taken 3 is that Liam Neeson survives an explosive car crash -- twice". Kyle Anderson of Entertainment Weekly also went positive with the review by giving the film a B− grade, commenting, "It's the weakest of the trilogy, but Taken 3 kicks just hard enough to survive another day."

In CinemaScore polls conducted during the opening weekend, cinema audiences gave Taken 3 an average grade of "B+" on an A+ to F scale, the same as its predecessor.

Accolades

References

External links
 
 
 
 

Taken (franchise)
2014 films
2014 action thriller films
French action thriller films
French sequel films
Spanish action thriller films
Spanish sequel films
American action thriller films
American sequel films
Films directed by Olivier Megaton
Films produced by Luc Besson
Films scored by Nathaniel Méchaly
Films with screenplays by Luc Besson
Films with screenplays by Robert Mark Kamen
French films about revenge
American films about revenge
Films about the Russian Mafia
Films set in Los Angeles
Films set in Afghanistan
Films shot in Los Angeles
Films shot in Georgia (U.S. state)
IMAX films
EuropaCorp films
20th Century Fox films
TSG Entertainment films
English-language French films
English-language Spanish films
French vigilante films
2010s English-language films
2010s American films
2010s French films